Oxford Public School, Ranchi is a Co-educational English medium senior secondary school in Ranchi, Jharkhand, India that was established on 16 April 1996. It is managed by the Tribal Rural Education and Welfare Society Registration Act of 1860, established by educationists and thinkers. The curriculum here followed is of C.B.S.E., New Delhi for the All India Secondary School Examination and All India Senior School Certificate Examination (10+2), in two streams viz., Science Commerce & Arts.

See also
Education in India
Literacy in India
List of schools in India

References

External links

Schools in Ranchi
High schools and secondary schools in Jharkhand
Private schools in Jharkhand
Co-educational schools in India
1996 establishments in Bihar
English-language schools
Educational institutions established in 1996